Andrei Aleksandrovich Chernov (27 August 1966 – 16 August 2017), also known as Andrew Chernov and Ache, was a Soviet and Russian programmer who was one of the founders of the Russian Internet and the creator of the character encoding KOI8-R. 

He is also known for his contributions to the esoteric counterculture of the Russian 1990s, especially the popularization of Thelema and the name of Aleister Crowley in post-Soviet Russia. He also hosted the website Vniz.net, which contained a collection of various rare pieces of media, including anime and art by Fin de siècle painters like Nicholas Kalmakoff, Louis Wain, and Franz von Bayros.

Education
Chernov was born in Moscow on 27 August 1966. He graduated from Moscow State University in the 1980s.

Career
Chernov was employed at the first Russian Internet service provider Demos, and worked on the computer network RELCOM which linked Russia to the global network.

He developed the Cyrillic character encoding KOI8-R, which he registered at the Internet Engineering Task Force in July 1993. In 1992-1996 he along with P. Sushkov worked on translation of the PGP software.

From 1993 to 2000, Chernov was a member of the FreeBSD Core Team. He is listed as contributor to the FreeBSD. In 2000 he participated in the first full-team BSDCon meeting. Earlier he was denied entry to the US as he was deemed "unsuitable".

Chernov died on August 16, 2017, at the age of 50 after a long illness. Before that he allegedly suffered from osteoporosis and broken leg.

Personal website 
In December 2018, Chernov's personal website Vniz.net became unavailable due to the expiration of domain registration, after which it was reconstructed at the new address Zachem.ne.jp with the use of Wayback materials.

References

External links 
 Zachem.ne.jp
 Another reconstruction of Chernov's personal website

1966 births
2017 deaths
Counterculture of the 1990s
English–Russian translators
FreeBSD people
Scientists from Moscow
Russian bloggers
Russian computer programmers
Russian occultists
Russian Internet celebrities
Russian Thelemites